The Tejano Roots Hall of Fame (TRHF) was created in August 2000 by Rito Silva in Alice, Texas. The Texas Legislature proclaimed the city of Alice as the birthplace of Tejano music, and opened the Tejano Roots Hall of Fame and Museum in Alice. The museum exhibits costumes, photographs, and other memorabilia donated by inductees. The 1997 Grammy Awards statue given to La Mafia is included in the museum as well as the accordion La Mafia member Armando Lichtenberger used during his group's tour in Mexico. The inaugural ceremony inducted 14 musicians all from San Antonio, Texas, the number increased to over 80 individuals in recent years.

Inductees of the Tejano Roots Hall of Fame

Son of Alice Award

Lifetime Achievement Award

See also 
List of halls and walks of fame

References

Works cited 

2000 establishments in the United States
Awards established in 2000
Hall of Fame
Music T
Music halls of fame
Music-related lists